Vietnam competed at the 2013 Southeast Asian Games. The 27th Southeast Asian Games took place in Naypyidaw, the capital of Myanmar, as well as in two other main cities, Yangon and Mandalay.

Medal table

Medalists

References

Nations at the 2013 Southeast Asian Games
Southeast Asian Games
2013
2013 in Vietnamese sport